The 1994 Liberty Bowl was held on December 31, 1994, in Memphis, Tennessee, at Liberty Bowl Memorial Stadium. The 36th edition of the Liberty Bowl, the game featured the Illinois Fighting Illini of the Big Ten Conference and the East Carolina Pirates, a football independent. Illinois won the game, 30–0.

Illinois was led by head coach Lou Tepper and quarterback Johnny Johnson, and had lost its final two regular season games. The program was making its twelfth bowl appearance, and its sixth bowl appearance in seven years, having lost its previous three bowls. East Carolina was led by head coach Steve Logan, and had won its final two regular season games. This was the eighth bowl game in Pirates' team history.

Game summary
The Illini took a 14-0 first-quarter lead on Johnny Johnson touchdown passes to Ken Dilger and Jasper Strong.  In the second quarter the Illini added a Chris Richardson field goal and a touchdown reception by Jason Dulick to pull away, 24-0.  Illinois' final score came in the third quarter on another Johnson TD strike, this time to Ty Douthard.  Johnson's four touchdown passes and 250 yards passing earned him Most Valuable Offensive Player and Most Valuable Player of the Game honors.  The Illini defense forced four interceptions and a fumble, allowing a total of only 271 total yards.  All-American linebacker Simeon Rice led the way with 10 tackles.  The Liberty Bowl was the Illini's first Bowl victory since 1990.  Illinois' 30-0 victory was the most lopsided win in Liberty Bowl history and was the only shutout posted among the 1994-95 bowls.

Scoring summary

Statistics

Team statistics

(Rushing-Passing-Total): UI - 134-255-389; ECU - 92-179-271

Individual statistical leaders

Rushing (Att.-Yds.-TD): UI - Ty Douthard 13-52-0; Robert Holcombe 12- 46-0; ECU - Marcus Crandell 41-20-4-0-179.

Passing (Att.-Comp.-Int.-TD-Yds.): UI - Johnny Johnson 30-18-0-4-250; Scott Weaver 4-2-0-0-5; ECU - Marcus Crandell 41-20-4-0-179.

Receiving (No.-Yds.-TD): UI - Jasper Strong 3-96-1, Ken Dilger 7-60-1, Jason Dulick 3-30-1; ECU - Scott Richards 4-25-0, Jason Nichols 6-55-0.

References

Liberty Bowl
Liberty Bowl
East Carolina Pirates football bowl games
Illinois Fighting Illini football bowl games
December 1994 sports events in the United States
Liberty Bowl